Luzoniella signifrons is a species of "conehead" bush crickets or katydids, endemic to the Philippines. It is the only species in the genus Luzoniella: which is named after the northern island where the type locality, Mount Makiling is situated.

References

Conocephalinae
Insects described in 1920
Monotypic Orthoptera genera